Hermann Pfanner Getränke GmbH is an Austrian beverage producer. It claims to have produced over 420 million liters in 2010, with more than 80% of the total volume exported to more than 80 countries. Headquartered in Lauterach in Vorarlberg, its main markets are Germany, Italy, Austria, Romania and the Czech Republic.

According to company-related reports, Pfanner is the leader in the German ice tea market with a share of 19.8 percent. It's also one of the largest fruit processors and juice producers in Europe.

History 
The company was founded in 1856. In 1856 Max Hermann Pfanner bought the "Gasthof Hirschen" restaurant in Lauterach and founded a small in-house brewery. In 1919 his grandson Hermann Pfanner took over and expanded the business by selling various agricultural products as well as wines and spirits.

By 1933 fruit juice was produced for the first time. After Hermann Pfanner died, his wife Ferdinanda and their children continued the business. Due to thoughtful business practices and technical innovations they were able to pass on the company to the next generation (Hedwig, Hans, Erwin and Egon Pfanner). This generation expanded the fruit juice business internationally. By 1984 these efforts were rewarded by the Austrian government with the coat of arms of Austria. In 1988 Hermann Pfanner Getränke GmbH was founded and handed over to the succeeding generation.

In 2001 production of fruit juice in Hamburg was started to cater for the growing German market. Pfanner is still a family-run business, managed by the Pfanner, Schneider and Dietrich families.

In 2006, the company exceeded 200 million Euros in sales for the first time.

Products 
Pfanner produces about 210 different products, fruit juices being among the best known ones. The company also produces ice teas, lemonades and other soft drinks.  The company also offers contract bottling services.

Pfanner and Fairtrade 
Pfanner started cooperating with Fairtrade in 2001. Today Pfanner is the biggest Fairtrade partner worldwide in the fruit juice sector and offers the widest range of fair trade products, according to company.

Production sites 
Pfanner operates factories in Austria, Germany, Italy and Ukraine. Their headquarters are in Lauterach, the biggest production site is in Enns (Upper Austria). Other sites are in Hamburg (Germany), Policoro (Italy) and in Bar (Ukraine).

References

External links

Food and drink companies of Austria
Food and drink companies established in 1856
Austrian brands
Economy of Vorarlberg